2009 LATAM Challenge Series season was the third season of LATAM Challenge Series.

Schedule

Results

Races

Points table
 see 2009 Formula Renault seasons

LATAM
LATAM Challenge Series races
2009 in Mexican motorsport
2009 in North American sport